Vasily Tikhonovich Podshibyakin (1 January 1928 – 20 May 1997) was a Soviet geologist and head of the trust “Yamalnefterazvedka”. He took part in discoveries of large and unique gas fields in the northern regions of Western Siberia, including Urengoy gas field – the world's second largest natural gas field .

Biography 
Podshibyakin was born on 1 January 1928 in Nikitskoe village in Tulskaya oblast. His grandfather was a batman of Nicholas II; his father – Tihon Afanasyevich – was one of the first kolkhoz presidents. There were four children in the family besides Vasiliy. 

From 1943 to 1945 he studied at vocational school №8 of Uzlovaya town to get profession of a machinist. In 1951 Podshibyakin entered Moscow Oil University. 

After completing his dissertation, Vasily asked to be assigned to Siberia. He became a mining engineer, and then he worked in the north of Tyumen oblast in Narym and Berezovo. Podshibyakin started as an assistant of a drilling foreman. In 1956 he was appointed the main engineer of Narym oil-exploring, in 1958 he became the director of that detachment.

In 1959 the Narym expedition was transferred to Tyumen oblast to Middle Ob side. Podshibyakin headed the Nizhnevartosk group of the Surgut complex expedition. 

In 1963 Vasily Posdshibyakin became the director of Tazovskaya oil-exploring expedition, since 1967 he was the oil and gas manager of Yamalo-Nenets geological trust.

With his collaboration the Igrimsk and Shuchtungorsk groups of gas fields were drilled during prospecting of Tazovskoe and Urengoy deposits. Under his direction 36 gas fields in Yamal-Nenetz region were opened including the Zapolyarnoe, Tambeiskoe, Medveshye, Yamburgskoe, Novoportovskoe and Urengoyskoe.

In 1970 V.A. Abazarov, G.P. Bogomyakov, I. Y. Girya, L.N. Kabaev, K. V. Kavalerov, A. G. Kraev, B.N. Krutchkov, V.P. Maksimov, O.A. Moskovtsev, I.I. Nesterov, S.A. Orudshev, V.T. Podshibyakin, F.K. Salmanov, V.G. Smirnov, V.V. Sobolevskiy, A.D. Storoshev, Y.B. Fain, V.Y. Filanovskiy – Zenkov were awarded the Lenin prizes 1970 for “discoveries of large and unique gas fields in northern regions of Western Siberia, effective geological exploring and preparing industrial reserves”.

In 1971, after the liquidation of the trust, he was appointed the post of director of Urengoi oil and gas prospecting expedition. In 1976 Podshibyakin was the director of Yamal production geological association “Yamalneftegeologiya”.  He was permanent leader of that union until 1997.

He was elected the deputy of State Duma of Yamalo-Nenets Autonomous Okrug.

Podshibyakin died on 20 May 1997 and was buried in Thervishevskoe graveyard near Raul-Yuri Ervier. On monument, as a precept for future generations, his credo is incused: "Go forward, look for and don't give up!", which Vasily Podshibyakin always adhered till the end of his life.

Memory 
On October 15, 2005 a monument, dedicated to Vasily Podshibyakin, was opened in Salekhard. A street and a microregion of this city were named after him.

Awards 
Hero of Socialist Labour (1983)
Order of Lenin (1983)
Two Order of Red Banner of Labour (1966 and 1979)
Lenin prize (1970)
Honourable geologist of Russian Federation

References 

 V.D. Tokarev, А.P. Lidov "Epoch of Ervier"
 Memories of Vasiliy Podshibyakin's son about his father http://www.m-vremya.ru/news/13506.html
 A.G. Kraev "To treasures of sticher land" . Salekhard, North publishing, 2009 http://gusi.yanao.ru/5/1/28/
 Russian State. Nature resources. Extractive industry. Conversion industry. Power engineering. — ASMO - press, 2001 http://asmo.ru/82.html?&L=cwtfussesyorill
 Historical persons of Salekhard, official site of the city http://www.salekhard.org/istoricheskie-lichnosti

Russian explorers
Soviet geologists
Russian geologists
Heroes of Socialist Labour
1928 births
1997 deaths